Terril is a city in Dickinson County, Iowa, United States. The population was 334 at the time of the 2020 census.

History
Terril (formerly spelled Terrill) was platted in 1895.

Geography

Demographics

2010 census
As of the census of 2010, there were 367 people, 164 households, and 106 families living in the city. The racial makeup of the city was 94.8% White, 0.5% African American, 1.1% Asian, 1.6% from other races, and 1.9% from two or more races. Hispanic or Latino of any race were 2.2% of the population.

There were 164 households, of which 26.2% had children under the age of 18 living with them, 48.8% were married couples living together, 7.9% had a female householder with no husband present, 7.9% had a male householder with no wife present, and 35.4% were non-families. 30.5% of all households were made up of individuals, and 9.7% had someone living alone who was 65 years of age or older. The average household size was 2.24 and the average family size was 2.74.

The median age in the city was 39.4 years. 21.8% of residents were under the age of 18; 9.2% were between the ages of 18 and 24; 25.6% were from 25 to 44; 28.1% were from 45 to 64; and 15.3% were 65 years of age or older. The gender makeup of the city was 52.9% male and 47.1% female.

2000 census
As of the census of 2000, there were 404 people, 171 households, and 108 families living in the city. The racial makeup of the city was 99.01% White, 0.25% African American, 0.50% Asian, and 0.25% from two or more races. Hispanic or Latino of any race were 0.25% of the population.

There were 171 households, out of which 29.8% had children under the age of 18 living with them, 53.8% were married couples living together, 5.8% had a female householder with no husband present, and 36.8% were non-families. 32.7% of all households were made up of individuals, and 15.8% had someone living alone who was 65 years of age or older. The average household size was 2.36 and the average family size was 2.99.

In the city, the population was spread out, with 25.7% under the age of 18, 9.9% from 18 to 24, 27.2% from 25 to 44, 18.8% from 45 to 64, and 18.3% who were 65 years of age or older. The median age was 35 years. For every 100 females, there were 104.0 males. For every 100 females age 18 and over, there were 101.3 males.

The median income for a household in the city was $34,583, and the median income for a family was $39,250. Males had a median income of $25,592 versus $19,306 for females. The per capita income for the city was $16,283. About 8.8% of families and 13.8% of the population were below the poverty line, including 32.5% of those under age 18 and 8.3% of those age 65 or over.

Education
Terril is served by the Graettinger–Terril Community School District, formed by the 2010 merger of the Terril and Graettinger districts.

Notable People
Darleane C. Hoffman (born 1926), nuclear chemist

References

External links

Cities in Dickinson County, Iowa
Cities in Iowa